CKCB-FM is a Canadian radio station broadcasting at 95.1 MHz in Collingwood, Ontario, with an adult contemporary format branded on-air as 95.1 The Peak FM.

The station began broadcasting in 1965 on 1400 kHz, until it moved to its current frequency in 1994. The station went through different ownerships over the years and in 2000 was acquired by Corus Entertainment.

The original on-air personality, who signed on CKCB at a community reception held at the Collingwood Shriner's Hall on the evening of Tuesday October 12, 1965 was Jim Craig, who went on to enjoy a successful Radio and TV career in SW Ontario and Western Canada prior to moving into teaching. Currently, he is a Professor of Broadcast Studies with the faculty of the Seneca College School of Media at York University in Toronto.

Rosemarie Hergott-Henderson and Bob Robinson (Sales) rounded out the sign-on staff of CKCB, and Bill Bramah joined as an announcer after 6 months, and later became well known as host of Global TV's "Bill Bramah's Ontario" and as an historical author.

Longtime broadcaster and former morning man John Nichols started at CKCB in 1971. John has received countless awards for his years of service to the Southern Georgian Bay area and he's active with many community organizations. He retired in December 2012.

References

External links 
 95.1 The Peak
 
 

Kcb
Kcb
Kcb
Collingwood, Ontario
Radio stations established in 1965
1965 establishments in Ontario